Patapol Ngernsrisuk (born 29 December 1980) is a Thai former badminton player. He competed in badminton at the 2004 Summer Olympics in men's doubles with partner Sudket Prapakamol. They were defeated in the round of 32 by Anthony Clark and Nathan Robertson of the United Kingdom. In 2007, he won the gold medals at the Summer Universiade in the men's doubles and mixed team event.

Ngernsrisuk is Ratchanok Intanon and Narissapat Lam's coach.

Achievements

Southeast Asian Games 
Men's doubles

Summer Universiade 
Men's doubles

World Junior Championships 
Boys' doubles

Asian Junior Championships 
Boys' doubles

IBF World Grand Prix 
The World Badminton Grand Prix was sanctioned by the International Badminton Federation from 1983 to 2006.

Men's doubles

IBF International 
Men's doubles

References

External links 

Patapol Ngernsrisuk
1980 births
Living people
Patapol Ngernsrisuk
Badminton players at the 2004 Summer Olympics
Patapol Ngernsrisuk
Badminton players at the 2002 Asian Games
Badminton players at the 2006 Asian Games
Patapol Ngernsrisuk
Competitors at the 2001 Southeast Asian Games
Competitors at the 2003 Southeast Asian Games
Competitors at the 2005 Southeast Asian Games
Competitors at the 2007 Southeast Asian Games
Patapol Ngernsrisuk
Patapol Ngernsrisuk
Southeast Asian Games medalists in badminton
Patapol Ngernsrisuk
Universiade medalists in badminton
Medalists at the 2007 Summer Universiade
Badminton coaches